Linda Ann Pondexter Chesterfield (born September 13, 1947, in Hope, Arkansas) is an American politician and a Democratic member of the Arkansas Senate for District 12, a position that she has held since January 14, 2013 (she started in District 30 before redistrcting changed her district). Chesterfield served consecutively in the Arkansas General Assembly from January 2011 until January 2013 in the Senate District 34 seat and non-consecutively from January 2003 until January 2009 in the Arkansas House of Representatives District 36 seat.

Education
Chesterfield graduated from Hendrix College in Conway, Arkansas, in 1965 and was the college's first African-American graduate.

Elections
2012 Redistricted to District 30, with Senator Gilbert Baker term limited, Chesterfield was unopposed for both the May 22, 2012 Democratic Primary and the November 6, 2012 General election.
2002 Initially in House District 36, when Representative Tommy Roebuck left the Legislature and left the seat open, Chesterfield won the three-way 2002 Democratic Primary (the NIMSP double-lists her in that election as Linda Pondexter) and was unopposed for the November 2002 General election.
2004 Chesterfield was unopposed for both the 2004 Democratic Primary and the November 2, 2004 General election.
2006 Chesterfield was unopposed for both the 2006 Democratic Primary and the November 7, 2006 General election.
2010 With District 34 Senator Tracy Steele running for the House District 39 seat, Chesterfield ran for the open District 5 Senate seat, won the May 18, 2010 Democratic Primary with 4,588 votes (62.4%) and was unopposed for the November 2, 2010 General election.

Chesterfield was the 2015 president of the Arkansas Legislative Black Caucus.

References

External links
Official page at the Arkansas General Assembly

Linda Chesterfield at Ballotpedia
Linda Pondexter Chesterfield at the National Institute on Money in State Politics

1947 births
Living people
African-American state legislators in Arkansas
African-American women in politics
Democratic Party Arkansas state senators
Hendrix College alumni
Democratic Party members of the Arkansas House of Representatives
People from Hope, Arkansas
Politicians from Little Rock, Arkansas
Women state legislators in Arkansas
School board members in Arkansas
Methodists from Arkansas
21st-century American politicians
21st-century American women politicians